Kosovo Polje may refer to:

Kosovo field (Kosovo), a large karst field, historical battlefield
Kosovo Polje, Serbian name of a town in Kosovo named after the field
 Kosovo Polje railway station
Kosovo Polje (Višegrad), a settlement in Bosnia and Herzegovina
, a small karst field near Knin